John Inglis Marshall (April 10, 1899 – September 9, 1976) was a Canadian politician. He represented the electoral district of Annapolis East in the Nova Scotia House of Assembly from 1963 to 1970, as a member of the Progressive Conservative Party of Nova Scotia.

Born in 1899 at Middleton, Nova Scotia, Marshall was educated at Maritime Business College. He married Annie Ethel Isabel Jensen in 1927. He was employed with the Maritime Telegraph and Telephone Company for 42 years, and served as a town councillor in Middleton. Marshall entered provincial politics in the 1963 election, winning the Annapolis East riding by 730 votes. He was re-elected in the 1967 election, but did not re-offer in the 1970 election. Marshall died at Middleton on September 9, 1976.

References

1899 births
1976 deaths
Progressive Conservative Association of Nova Scotia MLAs
People from Middleton, Nova Scotia
Nova Scotia municipal councillors